This is a list of listed buildings in South Lanarkshire. The list is split out by parish.

 List of listed buildings in Avondale, South Lanarkshire
 List of listed buildings in Biggar, South Lanarkshire
 List of listed buildings in Blantyre, South Lanarkshire
 List of listed buildings in Bothwell, South Lanarkshire
 List of listed buildings in Cambuslang, South Lanarkshire
 List of listed buildings in Carluke, South Lanarkshire
 List of listed buildings in Carmichael, South Lanarkshire
 List of listed buildings in Carmunnock, South Lanarkshire
 List of listed buildings in Carnwath, South Lanarkshire
 List of listed buildings in Carstairs, South Lanarkshire
 List of listed buildings in Covington, South Lanarkshire
 List of listed buildings in Crawford, South Lanarkshire
 List of listed buildings in Crawfordjohn, South Lanarkshire
 List of listed buildings in Culter, South Lanarkshire
 List of listed buildings in Dalserf, South Lanarkshire
 List of listed buildings in Dolphinton, South Lanarkshire
 List of listed buildings in Douglas, South Lanarkshire
 List of listed buildings in Dunsyre, South Lanarkshire
 List of listed buildings in East Kilbride, South Lanarkshire
 List of listed buildings in Glassford, South Lanarkshire
 List of listed buildings in Hamilton, South Lanarkshire
 List of listed buildings in Lanark, South Lanarkshire
 List of listed buildings in Lesmahagow, South Lanarkshire
 List of listed buildings in Libberton, South Lanarkshire
 List of listed buildings in Pettinain, South Lanarkshire
 List of listed buildings in Rutherglen, South Lanarkshire
 List of listed buildings in Stonehouse, South Lanarkshire
 List of listed buildings in Symington, South Lanarkshire
 List of listed buildings in Walston, South Lanarkshire
 List of listed buildings in Wandel And Lamington, South Lanarkshire
 List of listed buildings in Wiston And Roberton, South Lanarkshire

See also
 List of Category A listed buildings in South Lanarkshire

External links

South Lanarkshire